Keith Dunn is a harmonica player, singer, producer and songwriter. He was born in Boston and has been playing blues music for over 30 years. He is the founder of record label DeeTone Records.

Biography
As a nine-year-old, Dunn saw his first concert when T-Bone Walker played a free outdoor concert. At the age of 12, he bought a harmonica and began playing it at parties and with street players. He grew up listening to radio station W-I-L-D, initially taking a liking to Curtis Mayfield and Smokey Robinson. Later on he started listening to Archie Shepp and John Coltrane. He also bought records by Sonny Boy Williamson I and II). In his early career he played only acoustic harmonica.

After seeing the Junior Wells – Buddy Guy Band he put his first real band together, Blue Lightning. They played material by Junior Wells, Jimmy Rogers, Aleck "Rice" Miller (Sonny Boy Williamson II), and also James Cotton and Muddy Waters. Dunn's second band was called the Honeydrippers which was a guitar/saxophone driven group.

Dunn presently lives in the Netherlands. He has performed with James Cotton, Hubert Sumlin, Roy Eldridge, Big Walter Horton, Lurrie Bell, Jimmy Rogers and Big Mama Thornton. He works as a record producer and gives master classes in harmonica. He regularly tours with The Love Gloves and The International Blues Band and also appears as a guest musician with different artists, for instance Big Jack Johnson.

Awards
For the songwriting on his Alone With The Blues CD, Dunn received several awards (for the songs "Strange Things Are Happening" and "Need To Make A Dollar"). He also won the Talking Blues Award for the live performance of the songs on that CD.

Solo albums
 Alone With The Blues (Keith Dunn) (DeeTone Records, 2003)
 Delta Roll (Keith Dunn and Lars Vegas & The Love Gloves) (2006)

Albums produced by Keith Dunn
 She's Magic (Willem van Dullemen) released on DeeTone Records

References

External links
 Keith Dunn Keith Dunn Official Website
 DeeTone Records DeeTone Records Website

Living people
Musicians from Boston
American harmonica players
American blues singers
Year of birth missing (living people)